Carina Elizabeth Caicedo Caicedo (born 23 July 1987) is an Ecuadorian footballer who plays as a midfielder for Club Ñañas and the Ecuador women's national team.

International career
Caicedo was part of the Ecuadorian squad for the 2015 FIFA Women's World Cup.

References

External links
 
 
 

1987 births
Living people
Footballers from Quito
Women's association football midfielders
Women's association football forwards
Ecuadorian women's footballers
Ecuador women's international footballers
2015 FIFA Women's World Cup players
Pan American Games competitors for Ecuador
Footballers at the 2015 Pan American Games
Ecuadorian women's futsal players
21st-century Ecuadorian women